Sapphire Lake is an alpine lake in Custer County, Idaho, United States, located in the White Cloud Mountains in the Sawtooth National Recreation Area.  No trails lead to the lake, but it can be most easily accessed from Sawtooth National Forest trail 601.

Sapphire Lake is east of D. O. Lee Peak in the Big Boulder Lakes Basin along with Cove, Hook, and Cirque Lakes.

References

See also
 List of lakes of the White Cloud Mountains
 Sawtooth National Recreation Area
 White Cloud Mountains

Lakes of Idaho
Lakes of Custer County, Idaho
Glacial lakes of the United States
Glacial lakes of the Sawtooth National Forest